SAM-N-8 Zeus, also known as Zeus I, was a project by the Naval Ordnance Laboratory of the United States Navy to develop a guided anti-aircraft artillery shell for launch from  guns. Tested in the late 1940s, it was overtaken by advances in guided missile technology.

Design and development
Development of the Gun Launched Guided Projectile - Arrow Shell was initiated by the U.S. Navy's Naval ordnance Laboratory (NOL) in June 1947, with the intent of developing a guided subcaliber projectile capable of being fired from the Mark 16 8"/55 caliber (203mm) guns mounted in the s. In 1948, the project was officially classed as a guided missile, the designation XSAM-N-8 and name Zeus I being applied to the project.

Zeus consisted of a  shell, weighing , launched using a sabot in the 8-inch gun; the shell was fitted with stabilizing fins and a small course-correction rocket; the guidance system involved a radio command being sent to trigger the deflection charge.

Operational history
Test firings of the XSAM-N-8 begun in 1948; by early 1950, when the project was transferred from the Navy's missile development office to a purely gun-development project and the XSAM-N-8 designation cancelled, 115 test shells had been fired. An improved Zeus II variant, with full guidance and a sustainer rocket motor, was projected, and there were proposals to complete the unfinished battleship  as an anti-aircraft ship with quadruple turrets of 8" (203mm) guns firing Zeus. However ordinary guided missiles were proving increasingly satisfactory, and when the U.S. Navy's missile programs were rationalized later that year the Zeus project was cancelled.

References

Citations

Bibliography

External links
 Artist's impression of the USS Kentucky (BB-66) after conversion to an anti-aircraft ship on Deviant Arts

Abandoned military rocket and missile projects of the United States
Artillery shells
SAM-N-08